King Charles III is a 2014 play in blank verse by Mike Bartlett that premiered at the Almeida Theatre, London. The play is a fictional account of the accession and reign of King Charles III of the United Kingdom (who was then still Prince of Wales), and the limiting of the freedom of the press after the News International phone hacking scandal.

A 90-minute television adaptation was broadcast on BBC Two on 10 May 2017.

Production history 
Its premiere production was at the Almeida Theatre from 10 April to 31 May 2014, with previews from 3 April, directed by Rupert Goold. Charles was played by Tim Pigott-Smith, whilst the cast also included Margot Leicester as Camilla, Oliver Chris as Prince William, Lydia Wilson as Catherine, Richard Goulding as Prince Harry, Adam James as the Prime Minister and Nicholas Rowe as the Leader of the Opposition.

The production transferred to the West End's Wyndham's Theatre in September 2014 for an initial three-month run, later announcing an extension to the end of January 2015. When Pigott-Smith sustained a broken collar bone, he was replaced for five weeks by Miles Richardson.

Following its West End run, the play began a UK tour at the Birmingham Repertory Theatre with Robert Powell in the role of Charles in September 2015, ending with a month run by the Sydney Theatre Company (at the Roslyn Packer Theatre) making its Australian premiere in March 2016.

The play transferred to Broadway for a limited engagement with the original London cast, running at the Music Box Theatre from 1 November 2015 until 31 January 2016, following previews from 10 October 2015.

A typical performance ran for two hours and forty-five minutes, including one interval.

A newly mounted production of the play directed by David Muse with Robert Joy as King Charles began 7 February 2017 at the Shakespeare Theatre Company in Washington D.C.

A production of the play by the UCL Drama Society, directed by Josh Moore, with services provided by UCL Stage Crew, was performed at the Bloomsbury Theatre from the 17th-19th November 2022, shortly after Charles' real-world accession.

Cast

Plot
Charles and his family gather following the funeral of Queen Elizabeth II. Charles, as the new king, then holds his first weekly audience with the Prime Minister. They discuss a new Bill for statutory regulation of the press, which has passed the House of Commons and the House of Lords and awaits only Charles's royal assent to become law. Charles is concerned that the law restricts freedom of the press too much, and would allow governments to censor the news and prevent legitimate uncovering of abuse of power by the government. He asks the Prime Minister for alterations to the bill, but the Prime Minister refuses. The two men spar, as the Leader of the Opposition arrives for a weekly meeting with Charles, an innovation the new king has introduced. The Leader of the Opposition expresses his own doubts on the bill, but he sees little alternative but for Charles to sign.

In parallel, Prince Harry has begun a relationship with Jess Edwards, a republican. Both Charles and Prince William have seen the ghost of Princess Diana, promising each man that he will become "the greatest king of all". One of his first actions is to refuse to give royal assent to the press regulation bill. The Prime Minister holds a crisis meeting with the Leader of the Opposition and then goes alone to try to convince Charles to sign, but Charles continues to refuse. The Prime Minister then threatens to pass a new law bypassing the royal assent and then pass the press law, but Charles then dissolves Parliament before the Prime Minister can bring either of these plans into effect.

Protests begin across the country and especially in London. Charles increases the army guard at Buckingham Palace, offers his protection to Jess (whom the press have made the centre of a sex scandal), and agrees to Harry's wish to become a commoner. The Duchess of Cambridge (Prince William's wife Kate) proposes a solution: William will serve as a mediator between Parliament and his father. William announces this plan at a press conference without his father's knowledge or consent. Seeing this as a betrayal, Charles reacts angrily. Ultimately, Charles is forced to abdicate in favour of William, who plans to sign the press bill and restore the status quo between king and Parliament. The play concludes with Harry's rejection of Jess, and William and Kate's coronation as king and queen consort.

Critical reception 
The London and Broadway productions have both received positive reviews. The Telegraphs review said "attendance is compulsory", describing it as Barlett's best work to date.

The Globe and Mail called the play "dreary" despite its success in London and on Broadway. It is explained to be a Shakespearean-like play that has already passed its "best before" date. The author talks about how some aspects in this futuristic play came true, like how Prince Harry ends up happy with his new spouse Meghan Markle, who like Jess is also of African descent, or how the real King Charles III is known to express strong opinions on government issues.

Awards and nominations

Original London production

Broadway production

Radio adaptation 
The stage play was adapted into a radio play for BBC Radio 3's Drama on 3 and broadcast 12 July 2015, starring the cast of the original West End production. It was re-broadcast on 6 November 2016, again on BBC Radio 3.

TV film adaptation 
The play was adapted into a 90-minute TV film for BBC Two and Masterpiece on PBS. The adaptation first aired on BBC Two on 10 May 2017.

Before the film had even aired, politicians and biographers already did not like the idea of a non-fiction futuristic world without the Queen. After viewing the play as a whole, it was seen as more of a political thriller and tragedy. The TV film is an hour shorter than the play time due to a few parts being removed from the original script.

References

External links

Internet Broadway Database Listing

2014 plays
Plays about British royalty
Plays by Mike Bartlett
Cultural depictions of Charles III
Laurence Olivier Award-winning plays
West End plays
British plays adapted into films